"You Know What I Like" is a song by R&B singer El DeBarge featuring Chanté Moore issued as a single in 1992 on Warner Bros. Records. The single peaked at No. 14 on the Billboard Hot R&B Singles chart.

Overview
"You Know What I Like" was composed by El DeBarge and produced by Maurice White.  Singer Chanté Moore also made her debut as a recording artist on the song.

Samples
"You Know What I Like" was sampled by hip hop artist Warren G on the track "Keepin' It Strong" off his 2001 album The Return of the Regulator.

Appearances in other media
El DeBarge and Chante Moore also performed You Know What I Like on an episode of Soul Train.

References

1992 singles
1992 songs
American contemporary R&B songs
Song recordings produced by Maurice White
Warner Records singles